Gods of Chaos is the fourth album by The Flying Luttenbachers, released on November 17, 1998 through Skin Graft Records.

Track listing

Personnel 
The Flying Luttenbachers
Chuck Falzone – guitar, bass guitar, percussion
Bill Pisarri – bass guitar, violin, clarinet, percussion, cover art
Weasel Walter – drums, saxophone, vocals, synthesizer, clarinet
Production and additional personnel
Randy Lancelot – engineering
The Flying Luttenbachers – engineering
Colm O'Reilly – cover art

References

External links 
 

1998 albums
The Flying Luttenbachers albums
Skin Graft Records albums